"Ojalá" is a song by American duo Ha*Ash for their fifth studio album "30 de Febrero" (2017). A live version was included on their album Ha*Ash: En Vivo (2019). It was written by Ashley Grace, Hanna Nicole, Pablo Preciado and Paolo Stefanoni while the song was produced by Hanna Nicole and George Noriega.

Background and composition 
The track was released digitally on November 17, 2017, by Sony Music Entertainment México as a promotional tool for the album, which was released on fourteen days. The song takes place in an office setting and has the vibe of a pop song, that shows many texts between the girls and the guy who is an ex lover of Ashley.

The band started working on the song during the 1F Hecho Realidad Tour. It was written by Ashley Grace, Hanna Nicole and Pablo Preciado and produced by Hanna and George Noriega. The song was recorded at Miami, United States in 2017. No official music video has been released.

Commercial performance 
On  February 1, 2019, the song was certified gold in Mexico.

Music video 
A lyric video for "Ojalá" was released on November 17, 2017. It was directed by Diego Álvarez. , the video has over 52 million views on YouTube.

The music video for "Ojalá", recorded live for the live album Ha*Ash: En Vivo, was released on December 6, 2019. The video was filmed in Auditorio Nacional, Mexico City.

Live performances 
Ha*Ash included "Ojalá" on her "Gira 100 Años Contigo" (2018–2019).

Credits and personnel 
Credits adapted from Genius.

Recording and management

 Recording Country: United States
 Sony / ATV Discos Music Publishing LLC / Westwood Publishing
 (P) 2017 Sony Music Entertainment México, S.A. De C.V.

Ha*Ash
 Ashley Grace  – vocals, guitar, songwriting
 Hanna Nicole  – vocals, guitar, songwriting, production
Additional personnel
 Pablo Preciado  – songwriting
 Paolo Stefanoni  – songwriting
 Pate Wallace  – keyboards, engineer, editor
 Diego Contento  – engineer
 Dave Clauss  – engineer
 George Noriega  – engineer, editor, director, bass
 Matt Calderín  – drums

Certifications

Charts

Year-end charts

Release history

References 

Ha*Ash songs
Songs written by Ashley Grace
Songs written by Hanna Nicole
Songs written by Pablo Preciado
Song recordings produced by George Noriega
2017 songs
Spanish-language songs
Sony Music Latin singles